The Committee on Ethics, often known simply as the Ethics Committee, is one of the committees of the United States House of Representatives. Prior to the 112th Congress it was known as the Committee on Standards of Official Conduct.

The House Ethics Committee has often received criticism. In response to criticism, the House created the Office of Congressional Ethics (OCE), an independent non-partisan entity established to monitor ethical conduct in the House.

Members
The committee has an equal number of members from each party, unlike the rest of the committees, which are constituted with the majority of members and the committee chair coming from the party that controls the House. This even split has limited its power by giving either political party an effective veto over the actions of the committee. Members may not serve more than three terms on the committee, unless they serve as chair in their fourth term.

Members, 118th Congress

Resolutions electing members:  (D),  (R),  (Chair)

Past committee rosters

117th Congress

Resolutions electing members:  (Chair),  (Ranking Member),  (D),  (R),  (R)

116th Congress

Sources:  (Chair),  (Ranking Member),  (R),  (D),  (D)

115th Congress

Sources:  (R),  (D),  (R)

114th Congress

Sources:  (R),  (D)

113th Congress

Sources:  (R),  (D)

112th Congress

Source: 
 Resolutions ( and ) electing members to certain standing committees of the House of Representatives.

Function
The Ethics Committee has many functions, but they all revolve around the standards of ethical conduct for members of the House. Under this authority, it:

Agrees on a set of rules that regulate what behavior is considered ethical for members (rules relating to gifts, travel, campaign activities, treatment of staff,  conflicts of interest, etc. are typical)
Conducts investigations into whether members have violated these standards
Makes recommendations to the whole House on what action, if any, should be taken as a result of the investigations (e.g. censure, expulsion from the House, or nothing if the member is found not to be violating a rule)
Provides advice to members before they (the members) take action, so as to avoid uncertainty over ethical culpability.

History
The committee has a long history; the first matter it handled was on January 30, 1798, when Rep. Matthew Lyon of Vermont was accused of "gross indecency" after he spat on Rep. Roger Griswold of Connecticut after an exchange of insults (a week later, another complaint was filed against Lyon, this time for "gross indecency of language in his defense before this House"). Since the early days of the House, the committee's reports have gotten much more technical, delving into the details of campaign finance and other financial arcana.

As a result of the criminal investigation of Majority Leader Tom DeLay (R-TX), and lobbyist Jack Abramoff, there was pressure on the Ethics Committee to take action to admonish members involved in their activities. However, action was slow and the responsibility for impeding its progress was attributed to then-Speaker of the United States House of Representatives Dennis Hastert. When the committee did admonish Tom DeLay for a third time, Hastert removed three Republicans from the panel, including chairman Joel Hefley, (R-CO). Hastert had his own personal ethical problems, such as when he failed to take action when warned about Mark Foley's sexual relationships with young congressional pages. The new chairman, Doc Hastings (R-WA), acted to rein in the panel, leading to a Democratic boycott and preventing a quorum. The stalemate lasted three months until Hastings backed down. By then the committee was left broken and unable to take action in the DeLay case, the full Jack Abramoff Indian lobbying scandal, or other cases such as that of ranking Ethics Committee Democrat Jim McDermott (D-WA), who revealed violations by Newt Gingrich without authorization to the press.

On November 16, 2010, Charles Rangel (D-NY) was found guilty on 11 of the 12 charges against him by the adjudicatory subcommittee of the House Ethics Committee. They included solicitation of funds and donations for the non-profit Rangel Center from those with business before the Ways and Means Committee and the improper use of Congressional letterhead and other House resources in those solicitations; for submitting incomplete and inaccurate financial disclosures, for using an apartment as an office despite having Congressional dealings with its landlord and for failing to pay taxes on a Dominican villa.

On March 29, 2010, the OCE released a report dated January 28, 2010, that concluded Rep. Nathan Deal (R-GA) appeared to have improperly used his office staff to pressure Georgia officials to continue the exclusive, no-bid state vehicle inspection program that generated hundreds of thousands of dollars a year for his family's auto salvage business, Gainesville Salvage & Disposal.
The Ethics Committee never reported or commented on any investigation of Deal. On March 1, 2010, Deal resigned his seat saying he was concentrating on a run for governor, which excluded him from the Office of Congressional Ethics' jurisdiction. Besides Deal, another Georgia Republican, Rep. Paul Broun, accused of paying a consultant with taxpayer funds in his 2014 bid for a U.S. Senate race, avoided answering to charges by losing that primary and leaving office.

The OCE discovered, via a difficult investigation, that a 2013 trip nine members took to Azerbaijan was paid for by funds laundered for the purpose from the Azerbaijani government. The Ethics committee had asked the OCE to drop the case, only approving release of a summary finding in 2015, deeming the full report "not appropriate for release because the referral followed the OCE Board’s decision not to cease its investigations."

On January 2, 2017, one day before the 115th United States Congress was scheduled to convene for its first session, the House Republican majority voted 119–74 to effectively place the OCE under direct control of the House Ethics Committee, making any subsequent reviews of possible violations of criminal law by Congressional members dependent upon approval following referral to the Ethics Committee itself, or to federal law enforcement agencies. The new rules would have prevented the OCE from independently releasing public statements on pending or completed investigations. House Judiciary Committee chair Bob Goodlatte (R-Va.) defended the action on the rules amendment saying it "builds upon and strengthens the existing Office of Congressional Ethics by maintaining its primary area of focus of accepting and reviewing complaints from the public and referring them, if appropriate, to the Committee on Ethics." House Republicans reversed their plan to gut the OCE less than 24 hours after the initial vote, under bipartisan pressure from Representatives, their constituents and the president-elect, Donald Trump. In addition to negative Trump tweets, criticism was widespread including from Judicial Watch, the Project on Government Oversight, former Representative Bob Ney (R-OH), who was convicted of receiving bribes, and Abramoff, the lobbyist who provided such bribes.

See also
 United States Senate Select Committee on Ethics
 List of current United States House of Representatives committees

References

External links
Committee on Ethics, official site (Archive)
House Ethics Committee. Legislation activity and reports, Congress.gov.

Ethics
Ethics organizations
1798 establishments in the United States
Organizations established in 1798
Parliamentary committees on Justice